Zdeněk Lukáš (21 August 1928 in Prague – 13 July 2007 in Prague) was a prolific Czech composer who authored over 330 works. He graduated from a teachers' college and worked as a teacher from 1953 to 1963.

Selected works

Opera

 Ať žije mrtvý (Let the Dead Live), Op.52 (1967); 3 scenes; libretto by Jiří Hurt
 O smutné princezně Upolíně (Upolína, the Sad Princess), Op.57 (1968); little children's opera for radio; libretto by Kamil Bednář
 Domácí karneval (The Local Carnival), Op.60 (1968); Chamber opera for radio (or television); libretto by Zdeněk Barborka
 Planeta s tiše fialovou září (The Planet with the Light Purple Glow), Astronomical Opera, Op.141 (1979); libretto by Jiří Suchý
 Falkenštejn, Op.197 (1984–1985); libretto by Dagmar Ledečová
 Veta za vetu (Measure for Measure), Op.206 (1986); 2 acts (6 scenes); libretto by Dagmar Ledečová after William Shakespeare

Orchestra

 Pathetická předehra (Pathétique Overture), Op. 2
 Rej (Rondo), Op.3
 Matce (To Mother), Symphonic Poem, Op. 5
 Symfonická svita (Symphonic Suite), Op. 6
 Symfonietta No.1, Op.8
 Divertimento for Chamber Orchestra, Op. 16
 Symfonietta No. 2, Op. 18
 Symphony No. 1, Op. 22 (1960)
 Symphony No. 2, Op. 26 (1961)
 Partita for Chamber Orchestra, Op. 30
 Allegro for Chamber Orchestra, Op. 30a
 Symphony No.3 "Dove sta amore" for Mixed Chorus and Orchestra, Op. 40 (1965)
 Symfonietta solemnis, Op. 43 (1965)
 Andante for Large String Orchestra with Flute and Harp, Op. 46a (1965)
 Scherzoso for String Orchestra, Harp, Celesta and Piccolo, Op. 46b (1965)
 Symphony No.4, Op. 47 (1965)
 Partita in C for Chamber Orchestra, Op. 62 (1969)
 Postludium, Op.7 7 (1971)
 SAAB 96, Op. 79 (1971)
 Symphony No.5 for Lyric Soprano Solo and Large Orchestra, Op. 82 (1972)
 Malá svita (Little Suite) for Chamber Orchestra, Op. 92 (1972)
 A Tribute to Youth, Op. 97 (1973)
 Musica da Concerto for 12 Strings and Harpsichord, Op. 102 (1974)
 Princezna Pinkpink a šašek Cupkyhup, Suite for Chamber Orchestra, Op. 115 (1975)
 Bagately (Bagatelles), Op. 150 (1980)
 Finale Festoso, Festival Music in One Movement, Op. 172 (1982)
 Canti for String Orchestra, Op. 175 (1982)
 Ouvertura Boema, Festive Overture, Op. 187 (1984)
 Symphony No.6, Op. 232 (1991)
 Znělka, Op. 281 (1996)
 Symphony No.7 "Trionfo del tempo" for Soprano Solo and Orchestra, Op. 312 (2000)

Concert band

 Finale, Op.83 (1972)
 Musica Boema, 2 Movements for Winds, Brass, Harp, Xylophone and Glockenspiel, Op.137 (1978)
 Finale, Op.190 (1984)
 Sinfonia Brevis, Op.265 (1995)
 Pražská slavnostní hudba (Prague Festive Music), Op.267 (1995)
 Ave Maria, Aria for Winds, Op.325 (2002)
 Slavia – Galopp, Op.273 (1995)
 Choral – Präludium, Op.282 (1996)
 Musica Bohemica, Overture for Large Wind Orchestra, Op.285 (1997)
 Messaggio, Symphonic Poem for Large Wind Orchestra, Op.295 (1998)
 Metamorfosy, Op.299 (1998)
 Kyrie Eleison to the Memory of Saint Wenceslas, King of Bohemia, Op.331 (2003)
 Fanfára pro Hudbu hradní stráže (Fanfare for the Music of the Castle Guard), Op.337

Concertante

 Concerto [No.1] in G Minor for Piano and Orchestra, Op.4
 Fantazie for Piano and Orchestra, Op.9a
 Rondo for Piano and Orchestra, Op.9b
 Concerto [No.1] for Violin and Orchestra, Op.11 (1956)
 Concerto [No.1] for Cello and Orchestra, Op.13 (1957)
 Komorní svita (Chamber Suite) for Piano and String Orchestra, Op.15 (1958)
 Concertino for Violin, Piano and String Orchestra, Op.24
 Concerto for Soprano Saxophone and Orchestra, Op.34 (1963)
 Concerto Grosso No.1 for Solo String Quartet and String Orchestra, Op.36 (1964)
 Sonata Concertata for Piano and Orchestra, Op.49 (1966)
 Concerto for Violin, Viola and Orchestra, Op.58 (1968)
 Variations for Piano and Orchestra, Op.69 (1970)
 Svita (Suite) for Solo Clarinet, Flute (Piccolo), Cimbalom and Orchestra, Op.80 (1971)
 Concerto Grosso No.2 for Solo Flute, Solo Violin, Orchestra and Magnetic Tape, Op.87 (1972)
 Serenade for Flute, Oboe, Viola, Bassoon, String Orchestra and Percussion, Op.103 (1974)
 Preludium, Fuga and Postludium for Tenor-Saxophone and Chamber Orchestra, Op.107 (1974)
 Concerto for Bassoon and Orchestra, Op.113 (1976)
 Concerto for Clarinet and Orchestra, Op.119 (1976)
 Concerto Grosso No.3 for 6 Solo Violins and Chamber Orchestra, Op.129 (1977)
 Proměny (Transformations), Concert Piece for Piano and Orchestra, Op.140 (1978)
 Concerto for Harpsichord and String Orchestra, Op.152 (1980)
 Concerto [No.2] for Violin and Orchestra, Op.163 (1981)
 Concerto for Flute and Orchestra, Op.164 (1981)
 Koncertní hudba (Concert Music) for Solo Harp and String Orchestra, Op.177 (1982)
 Koncertantní svita (Suite Concertante) for Brass Quintet (2 Trumpets, Horn, 2 Trombones) and String Ensemble, Op.184 (1983)
 Concerto for Viola and Orchestra, Op.185 (1983)
 Concerto [No.2] for Piano and Orchestra, Op.192 (1984)
 Preludio e Rondo for Solo Violin and String Orchestra, Op.201 (1985)
 Concerto [No.2] for Cello and Orchestra, Op.204 (1986)
 Concerto for Horn and Orchestra, Op.223 (1989)
 Double Concerto for Violin, Cello and Orchestra, Op.224 (1989)
 Duo di basso, Double Concerto for Cello, Double Bass and String Chamber Orchestra, Op.227 (1989); revision of Op.210
 Concertino for Violin, Marimba and String Orchestra, Op.233 (1988)
 Za Dunaj, Piece for Harpsichord and Chamber Orchestra, Op.240
 Concerto for Cimbalom and String Orchestra, Op.244 (1991)
 Concertino Dedicato for Solo Violin and String Chamber Orchestra, Op.248 (1992)
 Concerto No.3 for Piano and Orchestra, Op.258 (1993)
 Concerto Grosso No.4 for 4 Saxophones and String Orchestra, Op.262 (1994)
 Vox cordis mei, Concerto for Organ, 2 Trumpets and String Orchestra, Op.293 (1997)
 Double Concerto for Oboe, Bassoon and Orchestra, Op.302 (1999)
 Double Concerto for Oboe, Bassoon and Orchestra, Op.304 (1999)
 Concerto for Trumpet and Orchestra, Op.323
 Symfonický koncert (Symphonic Concerto) for String Quartet and String Orchestra, Op.324
 Concerto for Violin, Piano and String Orchestra, Op.335
 Ricordi, Concerto for Cello and String Orchestra, Op.344 (2005)
 Dies Natalis for Solo Violin and String Orchestra, Op.348
 Sinfonia Concertante for Trumpet, Horn, Trombone and Orchestra, Op.349

Chamber music

 Čtyři fragmenty (4 Fragments) for Violin, Clarinet and Piano Left Hand, Op.10
 Kvartetino, String Quartet [No.1], Op.12
 Trio Violin, Piano and Small Drum, Op.32 (1962)
 String Quartet No.2, Op.42 (1965)
 Musica Rytmica, Concerto for Percussion (1 Player) and 8 Wind Instruments, Op. 51 (1966)
 Woodwind Quintet with Triangle, Op.61 (1968)
 Duetti for Violin, Bassoon, Viola, Clarinet, Cello, Oboe, Double Bass, Flute and Percussion, Op.66 (1969)
 Rondo for 4 Saxophones, Op.70 (1970)
 Amoroso, Miniature Incidental Piece for E Clarinet, Bagpipes and Double Bass, Op.75 (1971)
 String Quartet No.3, Op.93 (1973)
 Divertimento for Violin and Viola, Op.96 (1973)
 Tři ronda (3 Rondos) for Flute, Cello and Piano, Op.104 (1974)
 Piano Trio, Op.106 (1974)
 Kratochvíle pro pět (Pastime for Five), Piece for Woodwind Quintet, Op.121 (1976)
 Katedrály (Cathedrals), 5 Movements for Brass Quintet and Organ, Op.124 (1976)
 Co umím nakreslit, Suite for Chamber Ensemble of Instrumental Soloists, Op.127 (1977)
 Intarzie, 3 Movements for Violin, Viola and Cello, Op.132 (1977)
 Sonata di Danza [Piano Quartet No.1] for Violin, Viola, Cello and Piano, Op.151 (1980)
 Raccontino for E Baritone Saxophone and Percussion (2 Players), Op.153 (1980)
 Rozhovor s panem Myslivečkem v roce 1981 (Conversations with Mysliveček in the Year 1981), Rondo for Flute, Violin, Viola and Cello, Op.155 (1980)
 Serenade for Brass Quintet, Op.161 (1981)
 2 + 2 for E Alto Saxophone, Bass Clarinet, Marimba and Vibraphone, Op.179 (1982)
 Canzoni da Sonar for Flute, Oboe, Violin, Viola and Cello, Op.181 (1983)
 Dvojlístek, Little Serenade for Violin and Viola, Op.205a (1986)
 Dvojhry (Duo) for Violin and Cello, Op.207 (1987)
 Duo di Basso for Cello and Double Bass, Op.210 (1987); revised as Op.227
 Letní hudba (Summer Music) for 3 Trumpets, B Bass Trumpet, 2 Horns, 2 Trombones, Euphonium, Tuba and Percussion, Op.212 (1987)
 String Quartet No.4, Op.213 (1987)
 Intarzie II for Violin, Horn and Piano, Op.226 (1989)
 Piano Quartet No.2, Op.241 (1991)
 Malé finale (Little Finale) for String Quartet, Op.242 (1991)
 Trio for Violin, Viola and Cello, Op.246 (1991)
 Nonetto for Flute, Oboe, Clarinet, Bassoon, Horn, Violin, Viola, Cello and Double Bass, Op.250 (1992)
 Duetti II, Op.251 (1992)
 Quartetto con Flauto for Flute, Violin, Cello and Piano, Op.253 (1992)
 Kasace for Flute, Oboe and Viola, Op.270 (1995)
 Partita alla Fanfare for Brass Quintet, Op.271 (1995)
 Nonet for 3 Trumpets, 2 Horns, 3 Trombones and Tuba, Op.278
 Ricordo, Quintet for 2 Oboes, Bassoon, Harpsichord and Double Bass, Op.296 (1998)
 Serenata for Cello and Double Bass, Op.300 (1998)
 Pastorely (Pastorales), Easy Pieces for Violin, Cello and Piano, Op.303 (1999)
 Contrasti per quattro, String Quartet No.5, Op.305 (1999)
 Trio in D for Oboe, Clarinet and Bassoon, Op.310 (2000)
 Serenata Piccola for Flute, Oboe, Clarinet and Horn, Op.318
 Per Tutte le Corde, Quintet for Harp and String Quartet, Op.320 (2001)
 Cantico for 12 Cellos and 2 Double Basses, Op.333
 Sextet for 2 Violins, Viola, Cello, Double Bass and Piano, Op.339
 Trio Boemo for Violin, Cello and Piano, Op.343 (2004)
 Rita mattinata for String Quartet, Op.345
 Proměny lásky (Transformations of Love), Trio for Flute, Viola and Cello, Op.351
 Rotlevův šlojíř, Trio for Violin, Viola and Piano, Op.354 (2007)

Flute
 Sonatina for Flute and Piano, Op.19
 Canto for 4 Flutes and Harpsichord, Op.275 (1996)
 Cantabile e Fugato for Flute and Piano, Op.292 (1997)

Oboe
 Pět listů (5 Leaves) for Oboe and Harp, Op.249 (1992)
 Impulsioni for Oboe and Piano, Op.313 (2000)

Clarinet
 Sonata for Clarinet and Piano, Op.23
 Legenda for Bass Clarinet (or Tenor Saxophone) and Piano, Op.85 (1972)
 Koncertantní etuda (Concertante Etude) for Clarinet and Piano, Op.203 (1986)

Bassoon
 Rondo for Bassoon and Piano, Op.168 (1981)

Trumpet
 Dvojzpěvy (Duets) in 3 Parts for Trumpet in D and Organ, Op.125 (1976)
 Liturgical Songs for Solo Trumpet and Organ, Op.315 (2000)

Horn
 Corni di Praga, Partita for 4 Horns, Op.130 (1977)

Saxophone
 Lento Dramatico for Alto Saxophone and Piano, Op.264 (1994)

Violin
 Šťáhlavská Sonatina for Violin and Piano, Op.7
 Dvě bagately (2 Bagatelles) for Violin and Piano, Op.14
 Partita Semplice for 4 Violins and Piano, Op.37
 Tři dua (3 Duos) for 2 Violins, Op.188 (1984)
 Suite in 3 Parts for Solo Violin, Op.218 (1988)
 Dubnová improvizace (Capricious Improvization) for Violin and Piano, Op.234 (1991)
 Ricordo sul G, Piece for Violin and Piano, Op.340
 Far Musica for 3 Solo Violins, Op.341 (2004)

Viola
 Hudba k vernisáži for Viola and Piano, Op.68 (1970)
 Meditace (Meditation) for Viola and Harpsichord, Op.116 (1975)
 Meditace – Rondo (Meditation – Rondo) for Viola and Harpsichord, Op.128 (1977)
 Cantabile for Viola and Harpsichord, Op.216 (1988)
 Sonata for Viola Solo, Op.243 (1991)
 Canto Appassionato for Viola and Piano, Op.308 (1999)
 Hosprenglic, Duo for Viola and Harp, Op.328 (2002)
 Supplemento for Viola and Harpsichord, Op.334
 Dolore ed Amore for 4 Violas, Op.347

Cello
 Rondo for Cello and Harpsichord, Op.257
 Musica per Ogni Tempo for 2 Cellos and Piano, Op.317 (2000)
 Preludium per Due Sonatori for Solo Cello and Percussion, Op.352 (2006)

Guitar
 Preludio Brevis for 4 Guitars, Op.342 (2004)

Harp
 Canzonette for Harp, Op.98 (1973)

Organ
 Ex regione Prachaticensi, Piece for Solo Organ, Op.123 (1976)
 Pražské pastorale (Prague Pastorale), Piece for Solo Organ, Op.158 (1981)
 Tusta, Rhapsody for Organ, Op.290 (1997)

Harpsichord
 Partita for Harpsichord, Op.154 (1980)
 V podzámčí, 4 Czech Dances for Solo Harpsichord with Mixed Chorus, Op.170 (1981)

Piano
 Dva klavírní kusy (2 Piano Pieces), Op.21
 Musica per Piano, 3 Pieces, Op.45 (1965)
 Balada (Ballade), Op.78 (1972)
 Píseň (Song), Op.88 (1972)
 Tři písně pro klavír (3 Songs for Piano), Op.91a (1972)
 Míša, Ríša, Mikinka, Op.91b (1972)
 Čtyři studie pro klavír (4 Etudes for Piano), Op.139 (1978)
 Canzone, Op.173 (1982)
 Koncertantní sonatina (Concertante Sonatina), Op.208 (1987)
 Corali for 2 Pianos, Op.247 (1992)
 Andante and Allegro, Op.269 (1995)

Other works
 Quot sunt apes, Rondo for female choir to Latin medieval student's poetry, Op.166 (1981)

External links
  Official website
 Biography

1928 births
2007 deaths
20th-century classical composers
20th-century Czech male musicians
Czech classical composers
Czech male classical composers
Czech opera composers
Male opera composers
Musicians from Prague